Leroy Herbert Schoemann (August 30, 1914 – May 10, 1972) was a center in the National Football League. He played with the Green Bay Packers during the 1938 NFL season.

References

Players of American football from Milwaukee
Green Bay Packers players
American football centers
Marquette Golden Avalanche football players
1914 births
1972 deaths